Tarsoctenus corytus is a Neotropical species of butterfly in the family Hesperiidae. It was described by Pieter Cramer from Suriname, in Volume II of De uitlandsche Kapellen published posthumously in 1779.

Subspecies
Tarsoctenus corytus corytus (Suriname)
Tarsoctenus corytus corba Evans, 1952 (Peru)
Tarsoctenus corytus gaudialis (Hewitson, 1876) (Panama)

References

Hesperiidae
Hesperiidae of South America
Butterflies described in 1777